The V Mexico City International Tournament 1962 was a badminton competition held from 12 to 15 April 1962 in Mexico City.

Finalists

References

External links
 https://eresources.nlb.gov.sg/newspapers/Digitised/Article/straitstimes19620417-1.2.129.13

1962 in badminton
Badminton tournaments in Mexico
1962 in Mexican sports
April 1962 sports events in Mexico